Tommy Walker (born 15 March 1952) is a Scottish former  footballer who played as a midfielder for Airdrieonians, Arbroath, Dumbarton and Stirling Albion.

References

1952 births
Living people
People from Arbroath
Scottish footballers
Association football midfielders
Arbroath F.C. players
Airdrieonians F.C. (1878) players
Stirling Albion F.C. players
Dumbarton F.C. players
Scottish Football League players
Footballers from Angus, Scotland